The Wrong Man is a 1993 American thriller film directed by Jim McBride and starring Rosanna Arquette, Kevin Anderson, and John Lithgow. It was screened in the Un Certain Regard section at the 1993 Cannes Film Festival.

Cast
 Rosanna Arquette - Missy Mills
 Kevin Anderson - Alex Walker
 John Lithgow - Phillip Mills
 Jorge Cervera Jr. - Captain Diaz
 Ernesto Laguardia - Detective Ortega
 Robert Harper - Felix Crawley
 Dolores Heredia - Rosita
 José Escandón - Balneario Clerk
 Álvaro Carcaño - Bus Driver
 Ted Swanson - First Mate
 Paco Morayta - Bartender
 Gerardo Zepeda - Night Clerk
 Pedro Altamirano - Motorcycle Cop
 Anilú Pardo - Woman Mourner
 Alejandro Bracho - Lieutenant

References

External links

1993 films
1993 thriller films
American thriller films
1990s English-language films
Films directed by Jim McBride
1990s American films